HMS Zodiac was a Z-class destroyer of the Royal Navy built in 1944 by John I. Thornycroft, Woolston. She served during the Second World War, participating in operations in the North Sea and off the Norwegian coast, before taking part in some of the Arctic convoys. She spent a further ten years in Royal Navy service after the end of the war, before being sold to the Israeli Navy, which operated her as INS Yaffo. She saw action during the Suez Crisis in 1956, attacking Egyptian ships and was still active by the outbreak of the Six-Day War in 1967.

Second World War
On commissioning and work up Zodiac joined the 2nd Destroyer Flotilla, as part of the Home Fleet. She operated in the North West approaches and escorted some Russian convoys.

Postwar service
In 1946 Zodiac was part of the 2nd Destroyer Flotilla. Between 1947 and 1948 she was held in reserve at Portsmouth. In 1949 she was part of the 2nd Training Flotilla based at Portland. In 1952 she was placed in reserve at Portsmouth and in 1954 was given a refit at Penarth, prior to being sold to Israel on 15 July 1955 with sister ship .

Israeli service

Zodiac was sold to Israel in 1955 and commissioned into the Israeli Navy as INS Yaffo. She was refitted by Crighton at Liverpool and sailed for Israel in 1956.

On the morning of 31 October 1956, in the midst of the Suez Crisis, Egyptian destroyer Ibrahim el Awal, (an ex-British Hunt class destroyer), shelled Haifa harbor. A counter-attack by Yaffo and another Israeli destroyer Eilat, along with the  forced the Egyptian destroyer to steam back towards Port Said. Ibrahim al-Awal was then also attacked by a pair of IDF/AF Ouragans and a Dakota. The crew of the badly damaged vessel finally capitulated, and the ship was towed by the Israelis to Haifa, later becoming Haifa in the Israeli Navy.

Yaffo has been targeted by Egyptian missiles boats towards Port-Said, and both destroyers ( Yaffo & Eilat ) were sunk on 21 October 1967 in Mediterranean international waters, hit by 4 Soviet-made Styx missiles launched by two Egyptian missiles boats No.: 501 & 504.

References

Publications

External links

 HMS Zodiac at Uboat.net

 

1944 ships
World War II destroyers of the United Kingdom
W and Z-class destroyers
Yaffa
Ships built by John I. Thornycroft & Company